Donald Reilly (11 November 1933 – 18 June 2006) was a cartoonist best known for his long association with The New Yorker magazine. His style of drawing was to sketch quickly to achieve a feeling of spontaneity and to use his cartoons to make a social commentary on the times.

Reilly was born in Scranton, Pennsylvania, and began drawing for The New Yorker in 1964.  He created 1,107 cartoons and 16 front page covers for the magazine. His work had also appeared in Playboy, Mad, and Harvard Business Review amongst others.

In 1984, the town council of Garrett Park, Maryland voted to install a sign on a troublesome intersection, with the text "At Least Slow Down (formerly STOP)" (based on one of Reilly's New Yorker cartoons). However, it had to be replaced as it kept on being stolen.

He died in Norwalk, Connecticut of cancer, aged 72.

References

External links 
Examples of Donald Reilly's work 
Donald Reilly slide show narrated by Lee Lorenz

1933 births
2006 deaths
American cartoonists
The New Yorker cartoonists
People from Scranton, Pennsylvania
Deaths from cancer in Connecticut